Yoshida Metal Industry Co. Ltd also known as Yoshikin is a metal manufacturing company known for its production of GLOBAL knives.

History
The company was founded in 1954 in the Niigata Prefecture. The company originally focused on tableware but switched its focus to high carbon stainless steel blades in 1960.

In 1985 it introduced the GLOBAL brand of knives and currently has an international presence.

References

External links 
 

Companies based in Niigata Prefecture
Manufacturing companies established in 1954
Kitchen knife brands
Knife manufacturing companies
Metal companies of Japan
Japanese brands
1954 establishments in Japan